Platymantis sierramadrensis is a species of frog in the family Ceratobatrachidae.
It is endemic to the Sierra Madre of northeastern Luzon, Philippines.

Its natural habitats are subtropical or tropical dry forest, subtropical or tropical moist lowland forest, and subtropical or tropical moist montane forest.
It is threatened by habitat loss.

References

Platymantis
Amphibians of the Philippines
Taxonomy articles created by Polbot
Amphibians described in 1999